Derek Jeffries (born 22 March 1951 in Longsight, Manchester, England) is an English former footballer. He played for Manchester City, Crystal Palace, Peterborough United, Millwall and Chester. He played mainly as a central defender, but also operated in midfield.

Career
He played for Manchester City between 1968–1973. In the 1968–69 season he played no games. In the 1969–70 season he made his debut for City, playing seven games. In the 1970–71 season he made 19 appearances. In the 1971–72 season he played 12 games. He played as a substitute as City won the 1972 FA Charity Shield. In the 1972–73 he played 34 games. In 1973, he transferred to Crystal Palace, where he remained for four years apart from time on loan at Peterborough United and Millwall.

In the summer of 1977, Jeffries joined Chester, who were managed by his former Manchester City teammate Alan Oakes. In his first season, Jeffries helped them finish fifth in Division Three (now League One), their highest position in the last 60 years. Jeffries would be voted the club's player of the season in 1978-79 and was part of the side that reached the fifth round of the FA Cup the following season (equalling the club's best run). He left Chester on a free transfer in 1981 and drifted out of professional football, joining Telford United.

Honours
 1972 FA Charity Shield
 Crystal Palace F.C. Player of the Year: 1974–75
 Chester City F.C. Player of the Year: 1978–79

References

External links
Sporting heroes Derek Jeffries at Man City

1951 births
Living people
People from Longsight
English footballers
England under-23 international footballers
Association football central defenders
Manchester City F.C. players
Crystal Palace F.C. players
Peterborough United F.C. players
Millwall F.C. players
Chester City F.C. players
Telford United F.C. players
English Football League players
National League (English football) players